Lee Bum-ho (Hanja: 李杋浩; born November 25, 1981) is a South Korean former third baseman who played primarily in the KBO League. He bats and throws right-handed.

Lee is considered one of the best defensive third basemen in the KBO league history. He made great contributions on offense as well. He hit with considerable power, which enabled him to collect 20+ home runs nearly every season.

Professional career 

Lee made his pro debut in 2000, drafted by the Hanwha Eagles in the 2nd round (8th pick, 16th overall) of the 2000 KBO Draft.

He had a couple of mediocre seasons as a backup shortstop, but started to show signs of promise in 2002 when he batted .260 and hit 11 home runs. After the 2002 season, Lee was selected for the South Korea national baseball team for the first time and competed in the 2002 Intercontinental Cup held in Cuba. In the gold medal game, Lee hit a solo home run off Cuba's starter José Ibar in the bottom of the 4th inning to break a scoreless tie.

His stats dipped slightly in 2003, but broke out again in the 2004 season when he batted a career-high .308 with 23 home runs and 74 RBIs, playing in all 126 regular-season games as a shortstop.

In 2005, Lee moved from shortstop to third base, and hit a career-high 26 home runs with 68 RBIs. He won his first KBO League Golden Glove Award at third base, edging out Kim Dong-Joo in the balloting.

Prior to the 2006 season, Lee was called up to the South Korea national baseball team and competed in the inaugural World Baseball Classic.

From 2004 through 2007, Lee had four consecutive seasons with 20 or more home runs. In 2006, Lee won his second KBO League Golden Glove Award.

In 2008, he batted .276, hit 19 home runs, drove in 77 runs and stole a career-high 12 bases.

In March 2009, Lee competed for the South Korean national baseball team for the 2009 World Baseball Classic. For the Classic, Lee went 8-for-20 with 3 home runs, 5 runs and 7 RBIs in six games. He was fifth in RBI and tied for the lead with six others in home runs in the tournament, and named to the All-Star team at third base. In the 2009 KBO season, Lee had another solid performance, batting .284 with 25 home runs (7th in the league), 124 hits and a career-high 79 RBIs in 126 regular-season games as a third baseman.

Lee signed as a free agent with the Fukuoka SoftBank Hawks of the Japanese Pacific League in November 2009. He batted .226 in 48 games for the Hawks in 2010, with 4 home runs and 8 RBI. He hit his first NPB home run on April 9, 2010, against Nippon Ham at Fukuoka Dome in the seventh inning off Hirotoshi Masui.

On January 27, 2011, Lee returned to the KBO League, signing with the Kia Tigers.

Career statistics

Notable international careers

See also 
 List of KBO career hits leaders
 List of KBO career home run leaders
 List of KBO career RBI leaders

External links 
 Profile and stats on the KBO official website 

2009 World Baseball Classic players
2006 World Baseball Classic players
Fukuoka SoftBank Hawks players
Hanwha Eagles players
Kia Tigers players
South Korean expatriate baseball players in Japan
KBO League third basemen
1981 births
Living people
Sportspeople from Daegu